Valesi is a surname. Notable people with the surname include:

 Anna Valesi (born 2002), Italian pair skater
 Dionigi Valesi (1730–1780), Italian printmaker
 Giovanni Valesi (1735–1816), German singer